Sidi Badr, later known by his regnal name Shams ad-Dīn Muẓaffar Shāh, was the Sultan of Bengal from 1490 to 1494. Described by the Indo-Persian historians as a tyrant, his cruelty was said to have alienated the nobles as well as his common subjects.

Biography
Sidi Badr was born to a Muslim family of Habshi descent. Intending to takeover Bengal, he first killed Habash Khan, the regent of the young Sultan Mahmud Shah II, before proceeding to also kill the Sultan. Badr ascended the throne under the title of Shams-ud-Din Muzaffar Shah.

He developed an army of 30,000 soldiers; recruiting thousands of Afghans and 5,000 Abyssinians. In 896 AH (1490-1491 AD), he constructed a mosque in Gangarampur, adjacent to the Dargah of Makhdum Mawlana Ata. On 30 December 1492, his governor Khurshid Khan established a Jama Mosque near Nawabganj on the banks of the Mahananda River. He defeated the Kamata Kingdom in battle and conquered their territory in the year 898 AH (1492-93 AD) and subsequently issued coins bearing Kamata Mardan 898. On 2 July 1493, the Sultan constructed a building near the dargah of Nur Qutb Alam in Hazrat Pandua.

In 1494, his wazir (chief minister) Sayyid Husain led a rebellion in which he was killed. Husain succeeded as Sultan, assuming the name Alauddin Husain Shah, and founded the Hussain Shahi dynasty of Bengal. He also removed all Habshis from administrative posts, ending Habshi rule in Bengal. These Habshis eventually migrated to Gujarat and the Deccan.

See also
List of rulers of Bengal
History of Bengal
History of Bangladesh
History of India

References

Sultans of Bengal
1494 deaths
Year of birth unknown
15th-century Indian monarchs
Habshis of Bengal